Sir Adrian James Andrew Denis FitzGerald, 6th Baronet of Valencia, 24th Knight of Kerry (born 24 June 1940) is a Conservative Party politician in the UK and former Mayor of the Royal Borough of Kensington and Chelsea. He is the current "Green" Knight of Kerry, and thus has been the only holder of an active Irish hereditary knighthood since the 2011 death of his distant cousin Desmond FitzGerald, 29th Knight of Glin. The title has no official recognition in Ireland, which has been a republic since 18 April 1949 when the Republic of Ireland Act 1948 came into effect.

Family

The eldest son and heir of Sir George FitzGerald M.C., 5th Baronet, 23rd Knight of Kerry, by his wife Angela (Lady FitzGerald), daughter of Captain James Rankin Mitchell, of Mayfair, Adrian was educated at Harrow School.

Career

A founder-member (1962) of the Conservative Monday Club, he was firstly editor of their Newsletter, and from 1967–74 editor of their glossy magazine, Monday World. He has served as an elected Councillor of the Royal Borough of Kensington and Chelsea in London from 1974 until his retirement in 2002, as Mayor (1984–85), and as Chairman of their Education and Libraries Committees from 1995. In 1989-90 he was Deputy Leader of the London Fire and Civil Defence Authority.

Other interests

Sir Adrian has also served as Chairman of the Anglo-Polish Society for 1989–92, and is currently its president. He is vice chairman of the London chapter of the Irish Georgian Society and a patron of the Save Sloane Square campaign and the anti-euthanasia organisation Alert. 

Sir Adrian is a Knight of Malta, and was President of the Irish Association of the Sovereign Military Order of Malta (SMOM) resigning in May 2015. He divides his time between his homes in South Kensington, London, and Cappoquin, County Waterford, Ireland.

Ancestry

References

External links

 PUBLIC RECORD OFFICE of NORTHERN IRELAND. The FitzGerald (Knights of Kerry) Papers (MIC/639 and T/3075)
 BURKE'S PEERAGE & GENTRY'S A TO Z GUIDE
Sir Adrian FitzGerald on Geni.com
The Peerage

 (Ireland)

Irish knights
Adrian
1940 births
Living people
British people of Dutch-Jewish descent
British people of German-Jewish descent
Baronets in the Baronetage of the United Kingdom
Councillors in the Royal Borough of Kensington and Chelsea
Knights of Malta
People educated at Harrow School
Politicians from County Waterford
Mayors of places in Greater London
Place of birth missing (living people)